Roman Fricke (born 23 March 1977 in Bremen) is a German high jumper, who won two national titles in the men's high jump event.

He finished thirteenth 2003 World Championships in Paris with a jump of 2.20 metres. He also competed in the 2004 Olympics, but failed to qualify from his pool.

His personal best jump is 2.30 metres, achieved in May 2004 in Herzogenbuchsee.

External links

1977 births
Living people
Sportspeople from Bremen
German male high jumpers
Athletes (track and field) at the 2004 Summer Olympics
Olympic athletes of Germany